Tim Robinson is the name of:

 Tim Robinson (English cricketer) (born 1958), English cricketer and umpire
 Tim Robinson (New Zealand cricketer) (born 2002) 
 Tim Robinson (cartographer) (1935–2020), English cartographer
 Tim Robinson (rugby league) (born 1988), Australian rugby league player
 Tim Robinson (comedian) (born 1981), writer and former cast member for Saturday Night Live
 Tim Robinson (referee), English football referee